Tirumala septentrionis, the dark blue tiger, is a danaid butterfly found in the Indian subcontinent and Southeast Asia.

Description
Closely resembles Tirumala limniace, Cramer, but is always sufficiently distinct to be easily recognized, even on the wing. From T. limniace it differs on the upperside in the ground colour being darker and the semihyaline markings narrower, more distinct, and of a bluer tint, In the forewing, in interspace 1 the two streaks are narrower, never coalescent, the upper one forming an oval detached spot; the short streaks above vein 5 are outwardly never truncate, always acute. In the hindwing the two streaks if the discoidal cell united at base are wide apart at their apices, the lower one never formed into a hook. On the underside this species is generally darker, the apex of the forewing and the whole of the ground colour of the hindwing not being of the conspicuous golden brown that they are in T. limniace.

Wingspan 80–115 mm.

Distribution
The Himalayas from Simla to Sikkim, into Assam, Myanmar, Cambodia and Southeast Asia; Odisha; West Bengal, southern India, the Western Ghats and Nilgiris; Sri Lanka.

Habits
This species is one of the predominant species (78%) during the migratory season in southern India during which many species migrate. Both males and females appear to migrate in equal numbers.

Life cycle

Caterpillar is similar to that of T. limniace (see Journal of the Bombay Natural History Society x, 1896, p. 240). It is said by MacKinnon and de Nicéville to feed on Vallaris dichotoma (Journal of the Bombay Natural History Society xi, 1807, p. 212). Other species include Cosmostigma racemosa, Heterostemma brownii and Cocculus species.

See also
List of butterflies of India
List of butterflies of India (Nymphalidae)

References

External links
Sri Lanka Wild Life Information Database

Tirumala (butterfly)
Fauna of Southeast Asia
Butterflies of Indochina
Butterflies of Asia
Insects of Thailand
Butterflies described in 1874
Taxa named by Arthur Gardiner Butler